The Bega River is an intermittently open intermediate wave dominated barrier estuary that is located in the South Coast region of New South Wales, Australia.

Course
The Bega River rises at the confluence of the Bemboka River and Tantawanglo Creek at Morans Crossing, adjacent to the Snowy Mountains Highway. The headwaters of the river rise in the Kybeyan Range that is part of the Great Dividing Range. From Morans Crossing, the river flows generally east, then north northeast, before flowing to the northside of Bega where it meets its major tributary, the Brogo River. The river descends  over its  course.

The Bega River is known as the Bemboka River in its upper reaches.

See also

 List of rivers of Australia
 List of rivers of New South Wales (A–K)
 Rivers of New South Wales

References

External links
 

Rivers of New South Wales
South Coast (New South Wales)
Estuaries of New South Wales